Clube Atlético de Macedo de Cavaleiros (abbreviated as CA Macedo de Cavaleiros) is a Portuguese football club based in Macedo de Cavaleiros in the district of Bragança.

Background
CA Macedo de Cavaleiros currently plays in the Segunda Divisão Série Norte, which is the third tier of Portuguese football. The club was founded in 1954 and they play their home matches at the Municipal de Macedo de Cavaleiros in Macedo de Cavaleiros. The stadium is able to accommodate 2,700 spectators and was constructed in 2008.

The club is affiliated to Associação de Futebol de Bragança and has competed in the AF Bragança Taça. The club has also entered the national cup competition known as Taça de Portugal on many occasions.

Season to season

Honours
Portuguese Third Division: 2009/10
AF Bragança Divisão Honra: 1993/94, 2005/06

Footnotes

External links
Official website 

Football clubs in Portugal
Association football clubs established in 1954
1954 establishments in Portugal